Ratnapimpri is a village in western Indian State of Maharashtra in the Jalgaon District, located on the bank of the River Gopi. It has been situated at the strategic location between two talukas-- Parola and Amalner in Jalgaon district. Administratively, it comes in Parola taluka but the assembly constituency is Covered Under Amalner. It is surrounded by villages named: Bahadarpur, Bhokarbari, Sadavan, and Bhilali. The village consists Sardar, Patil, Bhadane, Borse, Suryawanshi, Dhangar, Wankhede, Bhil communities predominently exists. Ratnapimpri has Two other Sub-villages in it viz. Dabapimpri, and Holpimpri. Although having three villages in one, the administrative activities are being handled by a single Gram-Panchayat, and postal services centered in Holpimpri. Pin Code:425111

Transportation and communication

Situated along State Highway 14, Ratnapimpri is connected to Amalner and Parola. It is 45 km away from the Jalgaon District, with almost all state transport buses that pass stopping in the village, though Minnidors and autos are available as alternatives. One can reach the village in an average time of 15 minutes from Parola and n 25 minutes from Amalner.

Occupations and key activities
The dominant occupation in the village is farming. The area is bestowed with rich black soil and uses advanced irrigation techniques. Cotton, wheat, groundnuts, jowar, bajra, dadar and vegetables are the main crops. Products are traded in markets such as Amalner, Parola, Dharangaon, and Jalgaon. Dairy farming and entrepreneurship are also well-represented vocations.

Many people from the village are primarily engaged in agriculture profession, besides the younger ones, serve in state and central government and defense forces. Engineers from Ratnapimpri are associated with organizations in diverse fields such as mechanical, chemical, IT/software, hospitality and management. Cotton is main crop.

Cultural activities
Jay Balaji Rath Yatra,. Ahilya mata jayanti,Mahashivratri, Shiv Jayanit, Ganesh Chaturthi, Navratri, Hanuman Jayanit, Ram Navami, Makar Sankranti, Gudhi Padwa, Dasra, Holi, and Diwali are the main festivals celebrated together in Ratnapimpri.

During the Makar Sankranti and Dasra celebrations, people hug each other and do Pranāma to elders, while distributing sweets (til gul) and gold (aptyachi pane).  During Navratri, people leave their daily chores and engage in a nine-day celebration and worship of the Goddess Indasani.

Languages
The Marathi language is the official state language, but Ahirani Which is the Dialect of Marathi (along with Warhadi) is widely spoken and accepted language.

Education
The following schools are attended by local students:

Primary school: Jivan Shikshan Vidya Mandir, Ratnapimpri.
Primary school: Aadarsh prathmik vidya mandir, Dabapimpri.
Higher secondary school and college: Yashavant Madhyamik vidyalaya, Ratnapimpri.
Bahuddeshiya Aashram School, Ratnapimpri.
Pratap College Amalner, Kisan College and R.L. College in Parola are the nearest science, arts and commerce college.
Nath Nange baba Polytechnic and vasantrao more polytechnic are the nearest engg. colleges.

Temples and key locations

 Shivdham - temple to Shiva
 Maruti Mandir(total 6 temple's)
 Shri Datta Mandir
 saptshrungi mata mandir
 Ahilya mata smarak
 Sati mata mandir
 veer mandir
 Navnath Mandir
 Gayatri Mandir
 Mari Mata Mandir
 Tapovan – a temple, Homa Organic farm, and cow sanctuary established as an example of the Vedic lifestyle

References

Villages in Jalgaon district